Jahanabad Cantonment Public School & College was established in 1995 to ensure the proper education environment for the soldiers and local people living in the cantonment area. The college started with 11 teachers and got academic accreditation from the education board on 8 January 1996. Currently, the institute is managed by a group of 15 senior academic teacher under the supervision of the army officer. From 1997 to 2001, a total of six students took part in the collective merit list. In the HSC examination of 2016, the average passing rate in this institution is 99.36%.

Schools in Bangladesh
Educational Institutions affiliated with Bangladesh Army
Educational institutions of Khulna District